The 2013–14 Biathlon World Cup – Pursuit Women started at Friday December 9 in Hochfilzen and will finish Thursday March 21 in Holmenkollen. Defending titlist is Tora Berger of Norway.

2012-13 Top 3 Standings

Medal winners

Standings

Pursuit Women